Michelle Yim Wai-ling (born September 2, 1955), better known by her stage name Mai Suet, is a Hong Kong actress and elder sister of former actress Sidney Yim Wai-ming also known by stage name Suet Lei.

Career
In 1972, Yim started her acting career.
Yim's stage name is known as Mai Suet. Yim first appeared as a Yang female soldier in The 14 Amazons, a 1972 Mandarin drama and martial arts film directed by Cheng Kang.

CTV 
In 1975, Yim joined Commercial Television (CTV), and began her journey onto the television circles. In 1976, Yim acted in Legend of the Condor Heroes, a Wuxia TV series adaptation of Louis Cha's novel of the same title. For the first time, Yim took up the role as a female lead, portraying the character Wong Yung. This drama not only made her famous. but also made CTV's first million ratings. She has since been awarded the Top Ten Artistes Award several times.

With the closure of CTV in 1978, Yim became a contract-free actress. One of the companies, Television Broadcasts (TVB) invited her to guest-star in one of the period drama, The Twins.

RTV (now ATV) 
During the 1980s, Yim signed and joined Rediffusion Television (RTV) (now ATV). There, she acted in several well-known drama serials, such as The Dynasty, The Radical City, Tai Chi Master, Princess Cheung Ping, The Legendary Fok and more, earning her the title of the "Princess of Wuxia Drama".

After her contract with RTV terminated, Yim was once again a contract-free actress, and this allowed her to work for the two companies (TVB and ATV) more easily. However, such situation is considered rare due to the intense competition between the two broadcasting companies. Examples like The Legend of Master So and Tiger Hill Trail.

Other than films and television dramas, she has also acted in live performances. In 1982, she was invited by Roman Tam to perform in a musical play called Madame White Snake, portraying the role as the Green Snake. The cast included Roman Tam and Liza Wang.

In 1985, Yim returned to ATV and agreed to film a certain number of drama serials a year as part of her filming contract. At the same year, together with Damian Lau, she filmed a period drama, Chronicles of the Shadow Swordsman, adapted from one of Wuxia writer Liang Yusheng's works, Since then, both were in many drama serials.

In 1990, she performed in another musical play, Cyrano De Bergerac, a story adapted from French literature. Her co-star was Adam Cheng and allowed her to take part more in musicals in the future. Yim signed a contract with TVB in 1993, acting in a 300+ episodes sitcom, Mind Our Own Business. Together with the rest of that cast, she performed in another musical play (The Flirty Doctor). She was involved in a musical play (I Have a Date with Spring) with Alice Lau as well.

TVB 
In 2000, Yim and Damian Lau starred as Cheung Mo-kei's parents in the TVB Wuxia drama, The Heaven Sword and Dragon Saber.

Since 2000, she has been actively involved in several shows, including filming for drama serials, dancing, musical play, game shows, and even cooperated with overseas broadcasts companies. Cash Is King (2002) and The Rainbow Connection (2005) showed good examples. She has also hosted in programmes such as On the Road and Life In Frame (光影流情).

In this TVB's drama serial Moonlight Resonance, aired in July 2008, Yim portrays the villainous second wife, Yan Hung, who plots to have the family separated. Her performance in this serial has won her many praises and recognition. Yim won the Best Actress in the TVB Anniversary Awards 2008. In the final episode of Moonlight Resonance, which has the rating of over 47, the drama reached its peak at 50 rating during the scene when Yan Hung (character portrayed by Yim) slapped her daughter and shouted angrily to everyone present in her house.

On 3 December 2009, Yim won the Best Drama Performance by an Actress Award at the Asian Television Awards 2009 for her role in Moonlight Resonance.

Personal life
Michelle Yim had been in a long-term relationship with former soccer player and fellow actor, Wan Chi-keung, who died on 16 February 2010.
Yim was also in-laws with actor Norman Chui between 1983 and 1989 when he was married to her sister Sydney who is also an actress.

Awards
For her popular villain role in 2008's TVB acclaimed drama, 'Moonlight Resonance', she won Best Actress at TVB Anniversary Awards 2008 and also at Asian Television Awards 2009. She is the first Hong Kong television actress to sweep two Best Actress awards from a single role, and also the first Hong Kong actress to win Best Actress at the Asian Television Awards.

Filmography

Films

Television dramas

Musicals

References

External links
MichelleClan.com - Michelle Yim official website
Hong Kong Movie Database - Michelle Yim
 

1955 births
Living people
TVB veteran actors
Hong Kong television actresses
Hong Kong film actresses
20th-century Hong Kong actresses
21st-century Hong Kong actresses